Peter Polansky was the defending champion but lost in the final to Denis Shapovalov.

Shapovalov won the title after defeating Polansky 6–1, 3–6, 6–3 in the final.

Seeds

Draw

Finals

Top half

Bottom half

References
Main Draw
Qualifying Draw

Challenger Banque Nationale de Gatineau
Challenger de Gatineau